"Flowers Become Screens" is a 1994 song by the Canadian electronic music group Delerium featuring singer Kristy Thirsk from their 1994 album Semantic Spaces. The B-side of the single is the track "Incantation" from the same album. In some territories "Incantation" was used as the A-side of the single instead of "Flowers Become Screens".

"Flowers Becomes Screens" was remixed by Deepsky in 2000 as a bonus track on the album Poem.

Both songs have a music video directed by William Morrison and Paddy Gillen.

Track listing
 USA/Canada Single - 1994
 "Flowers Become Screens (Edit)" - 4:22 
 "Flowers Become Screens (Frequency Modulation Mix)" - 7:57 
 "Flowers Become Screens (Return To Babylon Mix)" - 5:34 
 "Incantation (12" Mix/Edit)" - 8:53

 USA/Canada Vinyl - 1994 
 "Flowers Become Screens (Frequency Modulation Mix)" - 7:57
 "Flowers Become Screens (Return To Babylon Mix) - 5:34
 "Flowers Become Screens (Cryogenics Mix) - 7:29)

 Incantation vinyl - 1994
 "Incantation (Extended Mix)" - 8:53 
 "Incantation (7" Edit)" - 8:53 
 "Incantation (Methadone Dub)" - 8:53

 German Single - 1994
 "Incantation (Radio Edit)" - 3:35 
 "Flowers Become Screens (Radio Edit)" - 4:22 
 "Flowers Become Screens (Frequency Modulation Mix)" - 7:57 
 "Flowers Become Screens (Return To Babylon Mix)" - 5:34

 Canada promo cd - 1995
 "Flowers Become Screens (Edit)" - 4:22 
 "Flatlands"

References

Delerium songs
1994 singles
1994 songs
Songs written by Bill Leeb
Songs written by Rhys Fulber
Nettwerk Records singles